The United Christian Democrats (CDU) was a minor Christian democratic political party in Italy. The CDU was a member of the European People's Party from 1995 until 2002.

History
The party was started in 1995 by splinters of the Italian People's Party (PPI) who wanted to join forces with Silvio Berlusconi's Forza Italia (FI). The split was led by Rocco Buttiglione (outgoing secretary of the PPI), Roberto Formigoni and Gianfranco Rotondi. The CDU's symbol used the crusader shield (scudo crociato) of Christian Democracy. In the 1995 regional elections the CDU formed joint lists with FI and Roberto Formigoni was elected President of Lombardy, while in 1996 it formed an alliance with the Christian Democratic Centre (CCD) for the 1996 general election, in which the CCD-CDU list scored 5.6%.

In June 1998 Buttiglione led the party into the Democratic Union for the Republic (UDR), a new Christian-democratic outfit launched by Francesco Cossiga and Clemente Mastella, who had left CCD to form the Christian Democrats for the Republic (CDR). In October, when Buttiglione briefly decided to support the centre-left government of Massimo D'Alema, along with the UDR, Roberto Formigoni, Raffaele Fitto, Maurizio Lupi and several regional councillors in Veneto, Lombardy and Piedmont left the party to form the Christian Democrats for Freedom, which was later merged into Forza Italia.

In February 1999 the UDR split between supporters of Cossiga, who formed the Union for the Republic (UpR), and the supporters of Mastella, who formed the Union of Democrats for Europe (UDEur). In the event, Buttiglione re-established the CDU as an independent party and started a rapprochement with Berlusconi.

In the 1999 European Parliament election the CDU obtained 2.2% and two MEPs, Buttiglione and Vitaliano Gemelli.

In the 2001 general election it formed an electoral alliance with CCD, known as the White Flower, gaining 3.2% of the vote. Following the election, Buttiglione was appointed Minister of European Affairs in Berlusconi II Cabinet. In December 2002 the CDU, the CCD and European Democracy (2.3% in 2001) were merged into the Union of Christian and Centre Democrats (UDC), of which Buttiglione was elected president, an office he would hold for twelve years.

Electoral results

Italian Parliament

European Parliament

Leadership
Secretary: Rocco Buttiglione (1995–2002)
President: Roberto Formigoni (1995–1998), Mario Tassone (1998–2002)

References

Political parties established in 1995
Political parties disestablished in 2002
Christian democratic parties in Italy
Centrist parties in Italy
Defunct Christian political parties
Catholic political parties
Defunct political parties in Italy
1995 establishments in Italy
2002 disestablishments in Italy